Karaseki  is a  small hamlet in the Aydıncık district of Mersin Province, Turkey. It is situated on the road connecting Aydıncık to Gülnar. The village is situated in the Taurus Mountains. The population of the village was 33 as of 2012. Due to a shortage of irrigation water, dry farming is common in the village.

References

Villages in Aydıncık District (Mersin)